The Pleasure of Finding Things Out is a collection of short works from American physicist Richard Feynman, including interviews, speeches, lectures, and printed articles. Among these is his famous 1959 lecture "There's Plenty of Room at the Bottom", his report on the Space Shuttle Challenger disaster, and his speech on scientific integrity in which he coined the term "cargo cult science". The original foreword was written by Freeman Dyson.

External links
 
 

1999 non-fiction books
Science books
Works by Richard Feynman
Books of interviews
Books of lectures
Speeches
American essay collections